Isoperla holochlora, the pale stripetail, is a species of green-winged stonefly in the family Perlodidae. It is found in North America.

References

External links

 

Perlodidae
Articles created by Qbugbot
Insects described in 1923